Levardis Robert Martyn "LeVar" Burton Jr.  (born February 16, 1957) is an American actor, director, and television host. He played Geordi La Forge in Star Trek: The Next Generation (1987–1994), Kunta Kinte in the ABC miniseries Roots (1977), and was host of the PBS Kids educational television series Reading Rainbow for more than 23 years (1983–2006). He received 12 Daytime Emmy Awards and a Peabody Award as host and executive producer of Reading Rainbow.

His other roles include Cap Jackson in Looking for Mr. Goodbar (1977), Donald Lang in Dummy (1979), Tommy Price in The Hunter (1980), which earned him an NAACP Image Award for Outstanding Actor in a Motion Picture, and Martin Luther King Jr. in Ali (2001). Burton received the Grammy Award for Best Spoken Word Album at the 42nd Annual Grammy Awards for his narration of the book The Autobiography of Martin Luther King Jr. In 1990, he was honored for his achievements in television with a star on the Hollywood Walk of Fame. 

Burton was chosen as the Grand Marshal of the 2022 Rose Parade in Pasadena, California.

Early life
Burton was born in Landstuhl, West Germany. His mother, Erma Gene (née Christian), was a social worker, administrator, and educator, while his father and namesake was a photographer for the U.S. Army Signal Corps stationed at Landstuhl at the time of his son's birth. Burton and his two sisters were raised by his mother in Sacramento, California.

As a teen, Burton, who was raised Catholic, entered St. Pius X Minor Seminary in Galt, California, intending to become a priest. At 17, questioning the Catholic faith, he changed his vocation to acting, and at 19, while an undergraduate at the University of Southern California, he won a starring role in the 1977 television miniseries Roots.

Career

Early work
Burton made his acting debut in 1976 with Almos' a Man, a film based on the Richard Wright short story "The Man Who Was Almost a Man," in which he stars alongside Madge Sinclair.

Roots

Burton's breakthrough role was as the young Kunta Kinte in the ABC miniseries Roots (1977), based on the novel of the same name by Alex Haley. Burton has described his first day playing Kunta as the start of his professional career. As a result of his performance, he was nominated for an Emmy in the Outstanding Lead Actor for a Single Appearance in a Drama or Comedy Series category.

He reprised the role of Kunta Kinte in the 1988 television film Roots: The Gift. When asked about the societal influence of Roots, Burton is quoted as saying: "It expanded the consciousness of people. Blacks and whites began to see each other as human beings, not as stereotypes. And if you throw a pebble into the pond, you're going to get ripples. I think the only constant is change, and it's always slow. Anything that happens overnight is lacking in foundation. Roots is part of a changing trend, and it's still being played out."

Reading Rainbow

Burton was the host and executive producer of Reading Rainbow starting in 1983 for PBS. The series ran for 23 seasons.

After Reading Rainbow went off the air in 2006, Burton and his business partner, Mark Wolfe, acquired the global rights to the brand  and formed RRKIDZ, a new media company for children.  Reading Rainbow was reimagined as an all new application for the iPad in 2012, and was an immediate success, becoming the number-one educational application within 36 hours. At RRKIDZ, Burton serves as co-founder and curator-in-chief, ensuring that the projects produced under the banner meet the high expectations and trust of the Reading Rainbow brand.

On May 28, 2014, Burton and numerous coworkers from other past works started a Kickstarter campaign project to bring back Reading Rainbow. To keep with the changing formats to which young children are exposed, his efforts are being directed at making this new program web based, following the success of the tablet application he helped create in recent years. His desire is to have the new Reading Rainbow be integrated into the classrooms of elementary schools across the country, and for schools in need to have free access. The Kickstarter campaign has since raised more than $5 million, reaching triple its goal in only three days.

In 2017, Burton was sued by the public broadcasting company WNED-TV for alleged copyright infringement for use of the Reading Rainbow brand in marketing the new iPad app and other online media. RRKIDZ later became known as LeVar Burton Kids and the iPad app, Skybrary.

Star Trek: The Next Generation

In 1986, Gene Roddenberry approached Burton with the role of Lieutenant Junior Grade Geordi La Forge in the Star Trek: The Next Generation television series. The character is blind but is granted "sight" through the use of a prosthetic device called a VISOR worn over his eyes. La Forge began as the USS Enterprise's helmsman, and as of the show's second season, had become its chief engineer. At the time, Burton was considerably better known than Patrick Stewart in the United States, due to his roles in Roots and Reading Rainbow. When the show premiered, the Associated Press stated that Burton's role was essentially the "new Spock". In a 2019 interview, Burton laughed in disbelief at the idea, stating "that speculation never came to fruition." Burton also portrayed La Forge in the subsequent feature films based on Star Trek: The Next Generation, from Star Trek Generations (1994) to Star Trek: Nemesis (2002). He directed two episodes of Star Trek: The Next Generation and several episodes of Star Trek: Deep Space Nine, Star Trek: Voyager, and Star Trek: Enterprise. He reprised the role of LaForge in the third and final season of Star Trek: Picard (2023).

Other appearances
Burton played a role as a visitor to Fantasy Island, guest star on “The Love Boat”, was a participant in Battle of the Network Stars, a guest of the Muppet Shows televised premiere party for the release of The Muppet Movie, and a frequent guest on several game shows.

In 1986, he appeared in the music video for the song "Word Up!" by the funk/R&B group Cameo.

In 1987, Burton played Dave Robinson, a journalist (sports writer), in the third season of Murder, She Wrote, episode 16 – "Death Takes a Dive", starring Angela Lansbury as Jessica Fletcher.

Burton accepted an invitation to host Rebop, a multicultural series designed for young people aged 9–15, produced by WGBH for PBS.

On television, Burton has helped dramatize the last days of Jim Jones's suicide cult in Guyana, the life and times of Jesse Owens, and the life of the nine-year-old Booker T. Washington. He portrayed Martin Luther King Jr. in the 2001 film Ali. He also portrayed Detroit Tiger Ron LeFlore in the television movie One in a Million, The Ron LeFlore Story.

In 1992, a clip of Burton's voice was sampled by DC Talk for the track "Time is..." on their album Free at Last. The sample is at the very end of the song, in which Burton can be heard saying: "Whoa, wait a minute."
He has also lent his voice to several animated projects, including Kwame in the cartoon series Captain Planet and the Planeteers (1990–1993) and The New Adventures of Captain Planet (1993–1996), Family Guy, Batman: The Animated Series and Gargoyles. Burton is on the audio version of books such as The Watsons Go to Birmingham: 1963 by Christopher Paul Curtis. Burton has been cast as voice actor for Black Lightning in Superman/Batman: Public Enemies DVD.

Burton appeared several times as a celebrity guest on the Dick Clark-hosted $25,000 and $100,000 Pyramids, from 1982 until 1988. Burton also was the strongest link in the special Star Trek episode of The Weakest Link. He defeated his final opponent Robert Picardo and won $167,500 for his charity, Junior Achievement of Southern California, a record for the show at that time and the largest amount won in any Celebrity Edition of the show (it was later surpassed by a $188,500 win in a "Tournament of Losers" episode).

He has made appearances in such sitcoms as Becker.

Burton is the host and executive producer of a documentary titled The Science of Peace, which was in production as of 2007. It investigates the science and technology aimed at enabling world peace, sometimes called peace science. The film explores some of the concepts of shared noetic consciousness, having been sponsored in part by the Institute of Noetic Sciences.

He appeared in an April Fool's episode of Smosh pretending to have taken over the channel and making various edits at popular Smosh videos.

He makes occasional appearances on This Week in Tech, where he is a self-proclaimed "nerd", and also participated in the Consumer Electronics Show 2010.

In 2010, Burton made an appearance on Tim and Eric Awesome Show, Great Job! as the ghost of himself in the episode "Greene Machine". In February 2011, he made an appearance as himself on NBC's Community in the episode "Intermediate Documentary Filmmaking", and then again in January 2014's "Geothermal Escapism".

Burton has appeared as a fictionalized, humorous version of himself on The Big Bang Theory, first appearing in the episode "The Toast Derivation", in which he almost attends a party thrown by Sheldon (before swearing off Twitter), in November 2012 in the episode "The Habitation Configuration", in which he appears on "Fun With Flags" in exchange for lunch and gas money, and again in the November 2014 episode "The Champagne Reflection", in which he returns for the 232nd episode of "Fun With Flags" in exchange for Sheldon deleting his contact details.

In 2012, he had a recurring role as dean Paul Haley on the TNT series Perception. For the second season (2013), he became part of the regular cast.

In 2014, he had a guest appearance in an introduction section for the 200th episode of Achievement Hunter's show, Achievement Hunter Weekly Update (AHWU). In May 2014, he appeared as a guest on the YouTube channel SciShow, explaining the science behind double, tertiary, and quaternary rainbows. Late in 2014, he had another guest appearance on a 24-hour Extra Life, a fundraising organization for Children's Miracle Network hospitals, stream by Rooster Teeth. Burton has also taped a recycling field trip for YouTube.

In 2017, Burton began a podcast, LeVar Burton Reads. Each episode features Burton reading a short story. In 2020, during the COVID-19 pandemic, he continues to read on his podcast and also give live readings three times a week during a Twitter livestream focused at different times to different children, young adults, and adult audiences.

In November 2020, he appeared as himself on The Eric Andre Show. His segment was a callback to Lance Reddick's interview (2013) in which he mentioned LeVar by name and dressed as an amalgam of Kunta Kinte and Geordi La Forge.

Burton served as a guest host on Jeopardy! from July 26 to July 30, 2021. This came after a petition asking the show's producers to select him was signed by more than 250,000 fans. The ratings during his appearance were below average due to tapering audience curiosity and forced viewership competition with NBC's coverage of the 2020 Summer Olympics in Tokyo, which trampled syndicated shows across the board. He has been very critical of the show's guest host process, stating that the show's then executive producer Mike Richards expressed disbelief about Burton wanting the job. According to Burton, Richards also claimed to have no interest in hosting the show himself even though this was disproven by later events.

Burton also teaches the "Power of Storytelling" in the MasterClass.

Directing
Throughout the 1990s and early 2000s, Burton directed episodes for each of the various Star Trek series then in production. He has directed more Star Trek episodes than any other former regular cast member.

He has also directed episodes of Charmed, JAG, Las Vegas, and Soul Food: The Series, as well as the miniseries Miracle's Boys and the biopic The Tiger Woods Story. He also directed the 1999 Disney Channel Original Movie Smart House starring Katey Sagal, Kevin Kilner and Jessica Steen. In August 2020, it was revealed that Burton will sit in the director's chair for Two-Front War from Lou Reda Productions, a multi-perspective docuseries will give "an emotionally raw look at the connection between the fight for civil rights in America and the struggle for equality of Black soldiers in Vietnam".

His first theatrical film direction was Blizzard (2003), for which he received a "Best of Fest" award from the Chicago International Children's Film Festival, and a Genie Award nomination for his work on the film's theme song, "Center of My Heart".

Burton is on the board of directors for the Directors Guild of America.

Personal life
LeVar Burton married Stephanie Cozart, a professional make-up artist, on October 3, 1992. Burton has two children, son Eian Burton Smith and daughter Michaela "Mica" Jean Burton. The family lives in Sherman Oaks, California.

Burton does not identify with any religion, saying: "I walked away from the seminary, I walked away from Catholicism, I walked away from organized religion because I felt that there was more for me to explore in the world, and that I could do that without adhering to one specific belief system or another."

In 2012, Burton joined the board of directors for the AIDS Research Alliance, a non-profit, medical research organization dedicated to finding a cure for AIDS.

In 2016, Burton was one of the five inaugural honorees to the Sacramento Walk of Stars. In 2019, Councilmember Larry Carr, representing the Meadowview neighborhood, led the renaming of Richfield Park to LeVar Burton Park in his honor. The park is in the Meadowview neighborhood, near the house where Burton and his sisters grew up.

Filmography

Awards and honors

Awards

Nominations
 1977 – Emmy – Outstanding Lead Actor for a Single Performance in a Drama or Comedy Series – Roots (Part 1, "Kunta Kinte")
 1998, 2001, 2005 – Image Awards variously for Outstanding Performer in a Children's Series and Outstanding Youth or Children's Series/Special — Reading Rainbow (both as Self and as Executive Producer)
 1991, 1992, 1994, 1995, 1999 – Daytime Emmy – Outstanding Children's Series – Reading Rainbow (Executive Producer)
 1985, 1986, 1987, 1988, 1989, 1990, 1991, 1992, 1993, 1994, 1995, 1996, 1997, 1998, 1999, 2003, 2005, 2006, 2007 – Daytime Emmy – Outstanding Performer in a Children's Series – Reading Rainbow (Self)
 2004 – Genie Award – Best Achievement in Music-Original Song – Blizzard (Co-composer "Center of My Heart")
 2006 – Black Reel Award – Best Director-Television – Miracle's Boys

Wins
 1990 – Star on the Hollywood Walk of Fame at 7030 Hollywood Boulevard for television achievement
 1992 – Peabody Award – Reading Rainbow (as executive producer of episode, "The Wall")
 1994, 1996, 1999, 2002, 2003 – Image Award – variously for Outstanding Performer in a Children's Series and Outstanding Youth or Children's Series/Special – Reading Rainbow (both as Self and as Executive Producer)
 2000 – Grammy Award for Best Spoken Word Album – The Autobiography of Martin Luther King Jr.
 1990, 1993, 1996, 1997, 1998, 2001, 2002, 2003, 2005, 2007 – Daytime Emmy – Outstanding Children's Series – Reading Rainbow (Executive Producer)
 2001, 2002 – Daytime Emmy –  Outstanding Performer in a Children's Series – Reading Rainbow (Self)
 2003 – Television Critics Association Award – Outstanding Achievement in Children's Programming – Reading Rainbow (Executive Producer)
 2003 - Audie Award for Inspirational or Spiritual Title - Conversations with God for Teens
 2004 – Chicago International Children's Film Festival – Best of Fest – Blizzard (Director)
 2010 - Audie Awards for Audiobook of the Year and Multi-Voiced Performance - Nelson Mandela's Favorite African Folktales
 2012 - Audie Award for Original Work - METAtropolis: Cascadia 
 2022 - Lifetime Achievement Award, Children's and Family Emmys

Books
 Aftermath, 1997, 
 The Rhino Who Swallowed a Storm, 2014, 
 A Kids Book About Imagination, 2021,

See also

References

Further reading
 Nishikawa, Kinohi. "LeVar Burton". The Greenwood Encyclopedia of African American Literature. Ed. Hans Ostrom and J. David Macey Jr., 5 vols. Westport, CT: Greenwood Press, 2005. 219.

External links

 
 RRKIDZ (Reading Rainbow) – LeVar Burton, Co-Founder, Curator-in-Chief 
 Burton / Wolfe Entertainment (production company)
 
 
 
 

1957 births
African-American male actors
African-American television directors
African-American television personalities
American male film actors
American male television actors
American male voice actors
American podcasters
American television directors
Daytime Emmy Award winners
Former Roman Catholics
Grammy Award winners
Living people
Male actors from California
Male actors from Sacramento, California
PBS people
Reading Rainbow
USC School of Dramatic Arts alumni
People from Landstuhl
20th-century American male actors
21st-century American male actors
HIV/AIDS activists
African-American religious skeptics
20th-century African-American people
21st-century African-American people
Jeopardy!